Black Ozarkers, who have also been referred to as Ozark Mountain Blacks, are Afro-Americans who are native to or inhabitants of the once isolated Ozarks uplift, a heavily forested and mountainous geo-cultural region in the U.S. states of Missouri, Arkansas, Oklahoma and the extreme southeastern corner of Kansas. They are mostly descendants of the enslaved from America's upper south and Appalachian region of Tennessee, Kentucky, Virginia, and North Carolina, being brought by European American slave owners in the Western expansion beginning in the early 19th century. Some are also descendants of Black people brought to the region enslaved by Native Americans on the Trail of Tears or up the Mississippi River by the French to work on small farms and in mineral mines during the French and Spanish colonial period. There was also a number of families that voluntarily migrated into the region and settled before and after the Civil War. All are of African descent with many also having biracial heritage being of both African and European or African and Indigenous descent, some like the Black Ozark folk artist Joseph Yoakum were of tri-racial heritage, descending from all three.

Slavery 
Slavery in the Ozarks was not as prevalent as slavery was in the deep south, with some counties being totally free of Black people and slave labor, however slavery still played a major part of the fabric and formation of many Ozark communities. By 1860 there were around 32,000 slaves in the entire Ozark uplift, few lived on large plantations and most lived on small farms or in urban areas and worked in households, mineral mines or in manufacturing plants. Of the more than 32,000 slaves documented in the Ozark uplift in the 1860 census, at least 20 percent of all the enslaved were mulatto, with 13 counties mostly in the interior containing slave populations that were at least one-third mulatto, the enslaved in the Ozarks were twice as likely to be mulatto than slaves in the nation as a whole, a sign that sexual violence and exploitation was rampant in slave owning communities throughout the region. The enslaved Ozarkers coming mostly from small slave holdings, were required to perform a multitude of task both skilled and unskilled. They worked on farms as field hands with various crops, tended to farm animals, were butlers, maids, butchers, cooks, carpenters, blacksmiths, masons, nurses, seamstresses, lumbermen, miners and interpreters for Native American and White enslavers. The diversity of skills that slaves developed in the Ozarks, especially in Missouri, gave them a great advantage in the early years after emancipation and over other slaves who were confined to a single skill or production of a single crop. During the Civil War period many of the enslaved in the Ozarks rebelled by running away, this was documented in the 1863 slave scheduled for Cass Township in Greene County, MO, where it was reported that a staggering one-third of the slave population had run away. Escaped slaves often headed towards free territory in Kansas and were often assisted by white Jayhawkers, who were militant abolitionist notorious for raiding pro slavery communities and escorting fugitive slaves to Kansas. Others found refuge within camps of Union Soldiers, some would end up joining and serving the Union in the war.

Post-Civil War 
In the years and decades following the Civil War, emancipated slaves or freedmen as they were called, who were native to the Ozarks and others who migrated to the region would continue contributing greatly to the Ozark communities they were apart of. Some lived in isolated rural areas and in small towns like Fayetteville and Eureka Springs, where they lived off of and farmed their own land and also worked as laborers, farmhands, midwives, cooks, domestic workers and porters. Some were teachers and ministers, some ran businesses from their home like laundries, cafe's, juke joints and boarding houses, renting rooms to travelers. Their communities were small and tight-knit, usually having no more than 1 or 2 churches and a single schoolhouse. In the more urban areas, they lived in larger segregated Black communities that were vibrant, self sustaining and very prosperous. Greene County, Missouri, which had one of the largest concentrations of Black people in the Ozarks pre and post Civil War, was home to a thriving Black middle-class and community of self sufficient, self reliant Afro-Americans. In the city of Springfield, which is known as the Queen City of the Ozarks, the Black community made up over 22 percent of the total population in 1880 and by 1900 would boast several Black owned grocery stores, one of which was the largest in the city. Springfield and the surrounding area was home to a variety of several Black owned businesses, there were many churches, adequate schools, a number of social clubs, many property owners, farmers, artisans, craftsman and Black professionals like doctors, lawyers, educators, barbers, postal workers, city workers and politicians. During this period around the turn of the early 20th century, the Black communities of the Ozarks had made great advances despite their disadvantages and the environment being very hostile.

Exodus
From the early days of settlement to post Civil War and beyond, some whites in the region resented the presence of free Black people and also the competition for labor jobs, land and political power. In the 1890's and early 1900's a racial cleansing campaign pushed by racist organizations and media would play a major role in the anti Black and extremely hostile attitudes among some white Ozarkers, often pushing propaganda that villainized Black people, portrayed the Black community as criminal and savage and created mass hysteria that would lead to an outbreak of intimidation and violence. From 1894 to 1909 a series of race riots and lynchings in south west Missouri and north west Arkansas would strike fear and cause trauma in the Black communities throughout the Ozarks. The anti Black campaign of violence pushed by White supremacist would lead to expulsions and a mass exodus of Afro-Americans from the Ozarks by the thousands, some estimates place the figure around as many as 40 thousand. Many left for St. Louis, Kansas City and other cities further west in Kansas and Oklahoma with the majority of Black Ozarkers that fled never coming back to live. A small resilient population stayed behind and continued on with life and building on to their communities, opening businesses, schools, churches and everything needed to support their families and their community. The Black communities of the Ozarks would continue a population decline for decades after the riots and exodus due to the ongoing oppression during Jim Crow, loss of community and economic opportunities. Today a small number of their descendants remain throughout the region with most concentrated in the more urban areas.

Notable people 
George Washington Carver

Phillarmonics

James Scott

Joseph Yoakum

Jessie Wilkins

Mary slave

Lynching of two (Aaron and Anthony)

William Tecumseh Vernon

John A. Lankford

Oliver Brown (American activist)

C. T. Vivian

Julia Lee (musician)

George Ewing Lee

Further reading 
White Man's Heaven The Lynching and Expulsion of Blacks in the Southern Ozarks, 1894-1909 By Kimberly Harper · 2010

A History of Ozarks, Vol. 2: The Conflicted Ozarks by Brooks Blevins. University of Illinois Press, 2019.

Arkansas' Ozark Mountain Blacks: An Introduction by Gordon D. Morgan and Peter Kunkel in JSTOR https://doi.org/10.2307/274187

Eureka Springs in Black and White: The Lost History of an African-American Neighborhood in JSTOR https://doi.org/10.2307/40023676

Oklahoma Black Cherokees by Wilson, Karen Coody Cooper Arcadia Publishing, Jun 19, 2012

Music Heard Deeply: Song and Ethnic Interaction in the Cherokee Ozarks by J. Justin Castro https://shareok.org/bitstream/handle/11244/323749/CastroJJ2008.pdf?sequence=1&isAllowed=y

My Old Man's A White Old Man" Black Women Search for Roots by Katherine Lederer 1990 https://thelibrary.org/lochist/periodicals/ozarkswatch/ow402l.htm

External links 
 https://oaahm.omeka.net/exhibits
 https://shareok.org/bitstream/handle/11244/323749/CastroJJ2008.pdf?sequence=1&isAllowed=y
 https://www.kuaf.com/documentaries/2016-01-30/arkansas-ozarks-african-americans-1820-to-1950
 https://thelibrary.org/lochist/blfamilies/index.html
 https://www.ozarksfirst.com/news/a-brief-history-of-african-americans-in-springfield-from-prosperity-to-lynchings-to-the-green-book/
 https://cdm17307.contentdm.oclc.org/digital/collection/Lederer/id/202/
 https://www.ksmu.org/show/sense-of-community/2021-12-16/springfields-old-jones-alley-was-the-heart-of-a-vibrant-and-largely-self-reliant-local-economy
 https://ozarkscivilwar.org/themes/slavery
 http://www.historicjoplin.org/?tag=african-americans-in-joplin

References 

African-American history of Oklahoma
African-American history of Missouri
Ozarks
African-American history of Arkansas